Crescent University is located in Abeokuta, Ogun State, Nigeria. It is a private university established by Judge Bola Ajibola under the banner of the Islamic Mission for Africa. It has the following colleges; The Bola Ajibola College of Law, The College of Environmental Sciences, The College of Information and Communication Technology, The College of Natural and Applied Sciences, The College of Arts, Social and Management Sciences and The College of Health Sciences.

History
In 2002, the Educational Board of the Islamic Mission for Africa (IMA) recommended the establishment of Crescent University, Abeokuta. The National Universities Commission approved the establishment of the university in 2005. The University commenced its academic program in December 2005.

References

External links
Crescent University Official website

Universities and colleges in Abeokuta
Educational institutions established in 2005
2005 establishments in Nigeria
Islamic universities and colleges in Nigeria